Stanislav Vagaský (born 16 August 1974) is a Slovak boxer. He competed in the men's flyweight event at the 1992 Summer Olympics.

References

1974 births
Living people
Slovak male boxers
Czechoslovak male boxers
Olympic boxers of Czechoslovakia
Boxers at the 1992 Summer Olympics
People from Vranov nad Topľou
Sportspeople from the Prešov Region
Flyweight boxers